Villa Cameron is a hamlet in southern Tierra del Fuego Island, and is the head of Timaukel commune, in Magallanes Region. Villa Cameron is located in the southern shore of Inútil Bay. The city is served by the Pampa Guanaco Airport .

References

Cities and towns in Tierra del Fuego
Ports and harbours of Chile
Hamlets in Chile
Populated places in Tierra del Fuego Province, Chile
Populated places in the fjords and channels of Chile